Strathmore Heights is a suburb in Melbourne, Victoria, Australia,  north-west of Melbourne's Central Business District, located within the City of Moonee Valley local government area. Strathmore Heights recorded a population of 1,047 at the 2021 census.

Strathmore Heights is located between Essendon Airport, the Albion–Jacana freight railway line, Moonee Ponds Creek and the Moonee Ponds Creek Trail.

History

Strathmore Heights was developed in 1960 by Strathmore Heights Proprietary Limited, a company promoted by Bruce Small, famed for his proprietorship of Malvern Star bicycles and sponsorship of world champion cycling athlete, Sir Hubert Opperman. From 1945, Bruce Small had also owned adjacent land at Gowanbrae, north of Strathmore Heights.

Being just north of Essendon Airport, which was the original Melbourne International Airport, many of the streets have aviation names such as:

 Boeing Road
 Lockheed Street
 De Havilland Avenue
 Fokker Street
 Vickers Avenue
 Caravelle Crescent
 Douglas Court
 Northrop Court

Public transport

Strathmore Heights, being remote from the rail system, is serviced solely by the following bus route:
469 Moonee Ponds – Niddrie SC via Essendon RS, Strathmore, Airport West Shoppingtown. Operated by Kastoria Bus Lines.

Tram route 59, operating between Airport West and the city, Glenroy and Oak Park railway stations are the nearest form of rail-based public transport.

Demographics

According to data from the :

 The most common ancestries in Strathmore Heights were Australian 23.0%, English 22.4%, Irish 8.5%, Italian 8.3% and Scottish 7.0%.
 In Strathmore Heights , 77.0% of people were born in Australia. The most common countries of birth were Italy 2.4%, England 1.7%, Greece 1.6%, Sri Lanka 1.6% and New Zealand 1.3%.
 The most common responses for religion in Strathmore Heights were Catholic 36.7%, No Religion, so described 25.0%, Anglican 10.1%, Not stated 7.1% and Eastern Orthodox 6.8%. In Strathmore Heights, Christianity was the largest religious group reported overall (66.6%) (this figure excludes not stated responses).
 In Strathmore Heights , 75.4% of people only spoke English at home. Other languages spoken at home included Greek 4.8%, Italian 3.3%, Arabic 1.8%, Sinhalese 1.7% and Turkish 1.4%.

See also
 City of Essendon – Strathmore Heights was previously within this former local government area.

References

Suburbs of Melbourne
Suburbs of the City of Moonee Valley